Carl Werner Hansen (born in Slagelse), commonly known as Carl W. Hansen, is a Danish former football referee and linesman, who officiated in the Danish top-flight, second-tier and third-tier including lower ranking leagues in the 1950s and 1960s and in both European and UEFA sanctioned club tournaments. From 1962 until 1969, he was a full international for FIFA, and officiated international friendlies and competitive games at senior, secondary 'B' team and under-19 level.

Career
Born in Slagelse, Hansen became affiliated with the Zealand FA (SBU) and the regional referee organisation, Sjællands Fodbolddommer-Union (SFU), as a referee, originally officiating lower ranking league matches at a regional level for the football association organising football on Zealand. He eventually moved up to a national level under the auspices of the Danish FA, supervising numerous top-tier Danish league games including cup matches in the 1950s and 1960s in a role as linesman and referee. He started officiating third-tier league matches sometime in the early 1950s, before moving up to second-tier and top-flight league games. Carl W. Hansen was assigned the role as linesman for the 1959 Danish Cup Final's replay match between Aarhus GF and Vejle BK. In the 1961–62 European Cup semi-final match between Tottenham Hotspur F.C. versus S.L. Benfica, he served as a linesmen with Aage Poulsen as the referee in the match. After having officiated the 1963–64 Danish Cup semi-final match in late April 1964 between Akademisk BK and Esbjerg fB, he was also designated the 1964 Danish Cup Final, featuring Esbjerg fB and Odense KFUM, as the referee by the Danish FA. He ended his domestic refereeing career in the top three league levels sometime in late 1969 or early 1970s, when he exceeded the then domestic age limit rule of 50 years, implemented in 1958 by the Football Referees Committee of the Danish FA.

At the Nordiske Konference held in Norway involving the four nordic football associations of Denmark, Finland, Norway and Sweden, a decision was made to allow experienced referees as linesmen in A, B side and youth (U) international matches, and Carl W. Hansen, Gunnar Michaelsen and Einer Poulsen were appointed for this purpose. He was appointed to the FIFA List on 24 June 1962 by the Danish FA as part of the association's then seven man large group of referees, appointed yearly, and could effectively start refereeing international matches beginning from 1 August 1962. He refereed several friendlies and international competitive games. His international assignments has included refereeing the match between Norway and Finland on 20 August 1964 as part of the 1964–67 Nordic Football Championship, serving as a linesman at the 'B' team friendly between Denmark and Sweden on 5 November 1966 and being a linesman at the Under-19 friendly between Denmark and Norway on 1 October 1960. He ended his tenure as FIFA referee on 31 July 1969.

International matches

Assignments as referee

Assignments as linesman

References

Danish football referees
People from Slagelse
Sportspeople from Region Zealand